is a passenger railway station located in the city of Anan, Tokushima Prefecture, Japan. It is operated by JR Shikoku and has the station number "M10".

Lines
Only local trains stop at the station.

Layout
The station consists of a side platform serving a single track. There is no station building, only a shelter on the platform and a separate toilet building. A ramp leads up to the platform from the access road. A designated parking area for bicycles is provided, underneath a nearby roadbridge.

Adjacent stations

History
Japanese Government Railways (JGR) opened the station on 1 October 1964 as an added station on the existing track of the Mugi Line. On 1 April 1987, with the privatization of Japanese National Railways (JNR), the successor of JGR, control of the station passed to JR Shikoku.

Passenger statistics
In fiscal 2019, the station was used by an average of 118 passengers daily.

Surrounding area
Nakagawa Sunflower Nursery School
Tokushima Prefectural Road No. 27 Anan Nakagawa Line
Tokushima Prefectural Road 128 Anan Hanoura Line
Anan Municipal Awa Koho / Folk Museum

See also
List of railway stations in Japan

References

External links

 JR Shikoku timetable}

Railway stations in Tokushima Prefecture
Railway stations in Japan opened in 1964
Anan, Tokushima